New Mexico No. 9, also known as NuMex No. 9, Number 9 pepper or simply No. 9, was the first of the New Mexican chile pod types of chile peppers. It is an heirloom chile, grown today only in special quantities in New Mexico, United States. It was also the first New Mexico chile cultivar to be bred for commercial growth. It was released to growers in 1913 by Mexican-American horticulturist Dr. Fabián García, who began selecting local breeds in 1894 for improvement. The No. 9 helped to cement chile as a staple food of New Mexican cuisine.

History
Chile peppers have been a staple of cuisine in the southwest United States and Mexico for centuries. In 1888, the New Mexico College of Agriculture and Mechanic Arts (NMA&MA, now known as  New Mexico State University) began a chile improvement program to improve crop yields and disease resistance in chile plants for the farmers of the region. Horticulturist Dr. Fabián García began selecting breeds from around southern New Mexico and northern Mexico in 1894, improving the local chiles grown by the Hispanic gardeners around Las Cruces. Historically, chiles varied widely in their yield and piquancy, and farmers had little control or prediction of these genetic variables. He selected 14 chile accessions growing in the region around Las Cruces of pasilla (dark brown), colorado (red or "colorful"), and negro (black) pod types, with the purpose of creating a milder chile for consumption by Anglo settlers, and also to produce a chile that was "larger, smoother, fleshier, more tapering and included a shoulder-less pod for canning purposes."

After eliminating other candidate cultivars, 'No. 9' had  "proven to be the best". According to Dr. García:
 and  

Dr  García released 'No. 9' seeds to farmers in 1913, standard pod size and a uniform heat level. It became the standard chile in New Mexican cuisine until 1950, and also helped to establish the Mexican food industry in the United States. It is the cultivar from which all modern New Mexico chile pod type cultivars descend.

References

Capsicum cultivars
Chili peppers
Crops originating from North America
Fruit vegetables
Mexican cuisine
Chile
Spices